Ho Lien Siew (5 September 1932 – 3 April 2021) was a Singaporean basketball player. He competed in the men's tournament at the 1956 Summer Olympics.

Ho represented Singapore in the national basketball team at the 1956 Summer Olympics at Melbourne, Australia, the 1959, 1961, 1965 Southeast Asian Peninsular Games and the 1962 Asian Games.

He won the Men's Basketball bronze medal at the 1961 Southeast Asian Peninsular Games Ho continued to play competitively until he was 50. He became a basketball coach until 82.

References

External links
 

1932 births
2021 deaths
Singaporean men's basketball players
Olympic basketball players of Singapore
Basketball players at the 1956 Summer Olympics
Southeast Asian Games medalists in basketball
Southeast Asian Games bronze medalists for Singapore
Competitors at the 1961 Southeast Asian Peninsular Games
Singaporean sportspeople of Chinese descent
20th-century Singaporean people
21st-century Singaporean people